Devineni Avinash (born 15 March 1988) is an Indian politician from the state of Andhra Pradesh belonging to YSR Congress Party. He is the current incharge of Vijayawada East (Assembly constituency), Andhra Pradesh. He joined YSR Congress Party in 2019 after resigning from Telugu Desam Party. He grabbed the state-wide attention when he contested in Gudivada (Assembly constituency) against Kodali Sri Venkateswara Rao in 2019 Andhra Pradesh Legislative Assembly elections. He is said to be one of the youngest leaders in Andhra Pradesh who has carried forward the legacy of Devineni Family. He has got an image of his own and has drawn lot of attraction amongst the youth and the masses.

Personal life 
Devineni Avinash was born on 15 March 1988 to late Devineni Nehru and Devineni Lakshmi. Avinash married Sudheera in Vijayawada and is blessed with two children namely Anvitha (Daughter) and Rajasekhar (Son).

Early life and education 
Avinash pursued his Bachelor of Commerce in Sri Venkateswara College, New Delhi and Master of Business Administration in London,  University of Business Management, London, UK.

Political career 
Avinash started his political journey as a president of United Students Organization (USO) established by his father late Devineni Nehru in Vijayawada, who served as a minister in the cabinet of late N. T. Rama Rao. Devineni Nehru also served as a MLA from Kankipadu mandal for five terms (1983, 1985, 1989, 1994 & 2004).

He is currently serving as Vijayawada East (Assembly constituency) in charge from YSR Congress Party. Avinash campaigned for his father Late Devineni Nehru who contested from Kankipadu mandal in Krishna district, Andhra Pradesh. He also served as a Samaikyandhra Movement Student JAC Convener gathering 100,000 students which drew the attention of the entire state. He actively participated in Samaikyandhra Movement including Jala Deeksha and various other student rallies. He also led the Special Status for Andhra Pradesh Protests post the state division which included agitations and bike rallies along with the youth.  Avinash served as Andhra Pradesh State Youth Congress President and Vijayawada Parliamentary Congress President during his tenure with Indian National Congress.

Devineni contested Vijayawada Lok Sabha Elections 2014 from Indian National Congress party. But, he got defeated by Kesineni Srinivas from Telugu Desam Party. Later, he along with his father Devineni Nehru joined Telugu Desam Party in 2016. He was appointed Telugu Yuvata State President which is a youth wing of Telugu Desam Party by then Chief minister of Andhra Pradesh N. Chandrababu Naidu.

Avinash again contested 2019 Gudivada (Assembly constituency), Andhra Pradesh against Kodali Sri Venkateswara Rao of YSR Congress Party which swept the 2019 General Elections including Gudivada (Assembly constituency). However, this election earned him a huge following in the entire state and he has created an identity of his own amongst the youth irrespective of political affiliations.

Later on, Avinash resigned from Telugu Desam Party and joined YSR Congress Party in November 2019 under the leadership of Andhra Pradesh Chief Minister Y. S. Jaganmohan Reddy. Avinash was under the impression that it is extremely important for the youngsters to focus on subjects and issues prevailing in the current society. In addition to that, it is also important to empower the youth for the bright future of the next generation. Currently, he is serving as Vijayawada East (Assembly constituency) incharge.

References 

1988 births
Living people
Sri Venkateswara University alumni
YSR Congress Party politicians
Politicians from Vijayawada